Season 10 of the American competitive reality television series Hell's Kitchen  premiered on June 4, 2012 on Fox and concluded on September 10, 2012. Chef de Cuisine Christina Wilson won the season and received a head chef position at Gordon Ramsay Steak at the Paris Las Vegas in the Las Vegas suburb of Paradise, Nevada.

Gordon Ramsay returned as head chef, Scott Leibfried and Andi van Willigan returned as sous chefs  and James Lukanik returned as the maître d'.

Production and development
This season saw an alteration to the show's format, with many episodes now being two-parters, depicting the team challenge and reward/punishment one night, followed by service and elimination the following night. This is the first and only season to date where one challenge produced no winner and both teams faced punishment.

Chefs
18 chefs competed in season 10. Full names per official site.

Notes

Contestant progress

Episodes

Notes

References

Hell's Kitchen (American TV series)
2012 American television seasons